This is a list of Ministers of Energy of Russia.

Russian SFSR

Minister of Energy and Electrification

Ministers of Fuel and Energy

Russian Federation

Ministers of Fuel and Energy

Ministers of Energy

Minister of Industry and Energy

Ministers of Energy

External links
 List of Russian ministers (rulers.org)
 Ministry of Energy official website

Energy
Energy

Lists of government ministers of the Soviet Union